The Lohi sheep is found in Punjab, Pakistan and Punjab, Rajasthan and Haryana in India. It is used for its carpet quality wool and meat production. The body is white and the head is usually tan, black or brown. 

The mature weight of the males is 65 kg (143 lb) with the female at 45 kg (99 lb). The average annual wool clip is 3 kg (6 lb) of medium wool, which is approximately 40 micrometres in diameter. Average daily milk production from the Lohi ewes is 1.2 liters (0.3 gallons). 

The very large lop ears, which are usually also tasseled, are the most distinctive feature. Rams and ewes are polled.

References

 Acharya R.M., 1982, "Sheep and goat breeds of India," Food and Agriculture Organization of the United Nations
 ICAR-CSWRI, 2016, "Breed Profiles - Breeds of Sheep in different agro-ecological regions in India and their major products," ICAR-Central Sheep and Wool Research Institute, Avikanagar, India
 NBAGR, "Registered Breeds of Sheep,"

Livestock in Punjab
Sheep breeds originating in Pakistan
Sheep breeds
Animal husbandry in Rajasthan